National Cadet Special Activities (NCSA) are Cadet Programs conducted by the Civil Air Patrol. NCSAs are designed to give cadets direct hands on experience with various aspects of the Civil Air Patrol program and provide meaningful insight into several aviation-related careers. There are 46 different special activities that a cadet may attend as of 2021. Each activity is approximately a week long, and all but two are offered during the Summer. 

The variety of NCSAs offered by CAP gives cadets a diverse experience. Activities focus on career exploration, leadership development, search and rescue skills, aeronautical training, Air Force familiarization, government, and a variety of other topics.

Cadet Special Activities Ribbon

Awarded to cadets and officers who participate in National Cadet Special Activities. Participants must be identified by the Civil Air Patrol project officer and approved by the member's region commander. Each subsequent activity is represented by a bronze star affixed to the basic ribbon. Cadets earning this ribbon may continue to wear the ribbon as a Senior Member.

Selection Process 
Cadets are selected to attend NCSAs with a points-based scoring system. Before cadets will be scored, their Squadron Commander and Wing Commander must approve their applications to their chosen NCSAs. Some squadrons may implement interviews or have a conversation with cadets and their parents/guardians about that cadet's chosen NCSAs. After the list of NCSAs for the upcoming summer is published, interested cadets must file their application online at Civil Air Patrol's e-Services website. Cadets have until the 15th of January to file their applications. If a cadet wishes to attend more than one NCSA, the cadet should indicate each activity he or she wishes to attend, and rank them in order from highest to lowest. Cadets should indicate any activity in which they wish to participate, even if the dates overlap.

Scoring system
The Objective Scoring System was designed to evaluate cadets in a fair, impartial, and standardized manner. Cadets earn points based on their age, rank, years of service, and prior activities. A squadron commander's recommendation, also known as a "green light", will add 100 points to a cadet's score. Ties between cadets with the same score are broken by age. These scores are calculated on February 18, so changes made after February 18 (such as promotions or birthdays) are not accounted for. 

After cadets are scored, they are grouped together by their category. The highest scoring cadet is assigned to his or her highest desired NCSA, followed by the second highest scoring cadet, and so on, until all cadets have been assigned. Cadets are automatically assigned to their most desired activity that has space available. Although all cadets have a chance to be assigned, not every cadet will be assigned because of a limited number of spaces. Cadets who have not been selected for an activity will be marked as "alternates", and will be moved to "primary" status as vacancies open up according to their score. The list of alternates for an activity is commonly referred to as a "short list", and slotting from the short list is handled by the Activity Director.

Notification of Selection 
On or about 1 March, cadets will be notified of their selection (or not) for each NCSA they applied for. Cadets are notified via the e-Services website.

Additionally, activity directors should contact their participants by 1 April and provide further information about the activity. Cadets must pay activity fees by 15 April or risk losing their slot to an alternate.

List of NCSAs for 2021 

On 6 June 2020, Civil Air Patrol released a list of activities for 2021.

References

External links 
  *

National Cadet Special Activities of the Civil Air Patrol